{{DISPLAYTITLE:C17H20N2O}}
The molecular formula C17H20N2O (molar mass: 268.35 g/mol, exact mass: 268.1576 u) may refer to:

 Centralite, or ethyl centralite
 Michler's ketone
 Remacemide

Molecular formulas